Starships & Spacecraft is a supplement published by Judges Guild in 1979 for Game Designers Workshop's science-fiction role-playing game Traveller.

Contents
Starships & Spacecraft is a play aid that consists of three large sheets of deck plans, technical data, and summary sheets of all the standard types of starships and auxiliary craft listed in Traveller Book 2 (Starships).

Publication history
Starships & Spacecraft was written by Dave Sering and was published in 1979 by Judges Guild as three 3-color map sheets.

Reception
Bob McWilliams reviewed Starships and Spacecraft for White Dwarf #15, giving it an overall rating of 5 out of 10, and stated that "If you feel you really cannot design and draw your own starship layouts (surely one of the pleasures of being a Traveller Referee), this is for you."

William A. Barton reviewed Starships & Spacecraft in The Space Gamer No. 32. Barton commented that "Starships & Spacecraft should prove quite helpful in making your Traveller campaign even more realistic to your players. It deserves a place in your Traveller library."

References

Judges Guild publications
Role-playing game supplements introduced in 1979
Traveller (role-playing game) supplements